"Mister Mental" is a song by British rock band The Eighties Matchbox B-Line Disaster and the first single from their album The Royal Society. It is the band's most popular song, receiving good amounts of airplay on Kerrang! TV and MTV Rocks (formerly MTV2). It has appeared on the soundtrack for the 2004 film Shaun of the Dead.

Track listing

CD single 1
"Mister Mental"
"Morning Has Broken" (live)
"6:30"
"Mister Mental" (video)

CD single 2
"Mister Mental"
"Flag Party"

Six-track promo
"Mister Mental"
"Morning Has Broken"
"6:30"
"Flag Party"
"Professionalism"
"Twentieth Century Boy" (Marc Bolan)

Video
The video shows the band running away from an unknown substance that made their heads expand. Throughout the video the band run away from the substance until it eventually catches them, exploding their heads one by one.

2004 singles
The Eighties Matchbox B-Line Disaster songs
2004 songs
Island Records singles